The 18th Michigan Infantry Regiment was an infantry regiment that served in the Union Army during the American Civil War.

Service
The 18th Michigan Infantry was mustered into Federal service at Hillsdale, Michigan, on August 26, 1862.

The regiment was mustered out of service on June 26, 1865.

Total strength and casualties
The regiment suffered 18 enlisted men who were killed in action or mortally wounded and 293 enlisted men who died of disease, for a total of 311 
fatalities.

Commanders
 Colonel Charles Doolittle

See also
List of Michigan Civil War Units
Michigan in the American Civil War

Notes

References
The Civil War Archive

Units and formations of the Union Army from Michigan
1865 disestablishments in Michigan
Hillsdale, Michigan
1862 establishments in Michigan
Military units and formations established in 1862
Military units and formations disestablished in 1865